Academy of Strategic Management Journal is a bi-monthly peer-reviewed academic journal that covers the fields of management and organization studies, business, trade and marketing. Its editors-in-chief are Shawn Carraher (University of Texas at Dallas), Sang-Bing Tsai (Civil Aviation University of China). It was established in 2002 and is published by Allied Business Academies, which is affiliated with the predatory OMICS Publishing Group.

Abstracting and indexing
The journal is abstracted and indexed in Scopus, DOAJ, and ABI/Inform.

References

External links
 

English-language journals
Bimonthly journals
Business and management journals
Publications established in 2002
Public administration journals
Accounting journals
Business law journals
Marketing journals
Allied Academies academic journals